Halle (Saale) Hauptbahnhof is the main railway station in the city of Halle (Saale) in southern part of the German state of Saxony-Anhalt. The station is situated east of the city centre and is a  category 2 station.

Importance
The station is one of the most important transport hubs in the state of Saxony-Anhalt. It is a stop for long-distance and regional services. In addition, it is part of the Leipzig-Halle S-Bahn network and is served by the trams and buses that are part of the city's public transport.

History 

In mid-1840 the Magdeburg-Leipzig Railway – initiated by city councillor, Matthäus Ludwig Wucherer, who supported the building of a railway from Magdeburg to Leipzig via Halle – built the first station in Halle, which was subsequently (1845 to 1847) rebuilt again to form a junction with the Thuringian Railway. The unusual feature of the route between Magdeburg and Leipzig was that it was the first cross-border railway link (from Prussia through Anhalt-Köthen to Saxony).

As further routes were added the station soon became too small, but could not be expanded because the various railway companies could not agree an overall concept. Not until 8 October 1890, after the nationalisation of one company and a five-year construction period could the new passenger station be opened. The station hall was largely destroyed during the Second World War and the wooden platform roofing replaced after the war with steel coverings.

In 1967 the S-Bahn was opened and hence a new platform added on the western side. In 1967/68 the station hall was clad by corrugated aluminium sheeting which matched the architecture and ideology of the time, and gave the station a typical modern, socialist appearance. As early as 1984 this covering was removed again however and the dilapidated domed roof was renovated. In 2002 the station, like many others in German cities, was comprehensively refurbished, rebuilt and provided with a range of shops.

In about 2016 the station will be linked to the planned, new Erfurt–Leipzig/Halle high-speed railway. By 2008 the southern approach had been rebuilt over a length of 5 kilometres and now runs under the new Saale-Elster viaduct (to which a connection is being built) towards Erfurt.

Layout 

Halle is an 'island station', i.e. it is located between the main sets of tracks. It has 13 platforms, of which 10 are covered by the station hall. The actual station building is located in the middle between tracks 6 and 7. In the station halls are small shops and restaurants/cafes.

Rail services

Long-distance services
The station is on the intersection of railway links from Berlin to Erfurt and Dresden to Magdeburg. InterCity (IC) and Intercity-Express (ICE) trains stop at the station.

Local services
Halle is linked to the surrounding area with local services on the RB, RE and S-Bahn lines as well as other cities such as Kassel or Eisenach.

Internal city transport links
The station is accessible from several major roads. A fast road (An der Magistrale) links the Hauptbahnhof to the west of the city (Neustadt, Nietleben and Dölau districts) and the B 80 links it to the western outskirts of Halle (Halleschen Vorland (West)).

The public transport system is provided by HAVAG. Tram routes 2, 4, 5, 7, 9, 10 and 12 and bus routes 30 and 44 all stop at the station, as do OBS buses.

Goods traffic
The Halle (Saale) marshalling yard on both sides of the tracks to the east next to the passenger station was formerly important, but is largely closed today. A modern marshalling yard is planned to be built on the same site however.

Notes

Railway stations in Halle (Saale)
Transport in Halle (Saale)
Railway stations in Germany opened in 1890